Instituto Regiomontano is a private institution serving students from Pre-School through High School in Monterrey, Nuevo Leon. It is part of the Institute of the Brothers of the Christian Schools. It has two campus: Chepe Vera and Cumbres. The actual principal of the school is  Alejandro Romero Frausto. In September 2012 the school turned 70.

Monterrey